Fields of Honor: The American War for Independence is a 2000 board game published by Pinnacle Entertainment Group. It is the first of Pinnacle Entertainment Group's Showcase Game series.

Reception
The reviewer from the online second volume of Pyramid stated that "FoH: AWI allows beginning and experienced players alike with an enjoyable and attractive game that can be easily played within fifteen minutes of opening the box."

Fields of Honor: The American War for Independence won the Origins Awards in the category "Best Historical Miniatures Rules 2000 ".

References

Board games introduced in 2000
Origins Award winners
Pinnacle Entertainment Group games